Mardan District is a district in Mardan Division of Khyber Pakhtunkhwa province in Pakistan. The district is named after Mardan city, which is also the headquarters of the district.  The district is famous for its agriculture industry, Peerah(پیڑا) the famous sooghaat of mardan and for its archaeological sites of Takht-i-Bhai, Jamal Garhi and Sawal Dher.

History
The literal meaning of Mardan is the land of brave men.The district lies from 34° 05' to 34° 32' north latitudes and 71" 48' to 72° 25' east longitudes. It is bounded on the north by Buner and Malakand districts, on the east by Swabi and Buner districts, on the south by Nowshera district and on the west by Charsadda and Malakand districts. The total area of the district is 1632 square kilometres.

Ancient history
Mardan District is a part of the Peshawar valley the whole area was once part of the ancient kingdom of Gandhara, the remains of which are scattered throughout the district.

The armies of Alexander the Great reached the Indus Valley by two separate routes, one through the Khyber Pass and the other led by Alexander himself through Kunar, Bajaur, Swat, and Buner in 326 BCE. After Alexander's death, the valley came under the rule of Chandragupta, who ruled the valley from 297 to 321 BCE. During the reign of the Buddhist emperor Ashoka (the grandson of Chandragupta) Buddhism became the religion of the Peshawar Valley. The valley saw the revival of Hinduism after the Greeks took over in the time of King Mehanda. The Scythians and Indians followed and retained control of the valley till the 7th century CE.

Arrival of Afghans
By the 11th century, the Pashtuns had appeared in the valley. At that time the Peshawar valley was under control of the rulers at Lahore. The pukhtuns joined the Gakkhars who held the country between the Indus and the Jhelum rivers and compelled the Lahore rulers to cede to them the hill country west of the Indus and south of the Kabul River.

Ghaznavid Era
In the 10th century the area came under the control of Sultan Sabuktigin who defeated Raja Jaipal, the Hindu ruler of Lahore. Sabuktgin's son Sultan Mahmud of Ghazni made this area the rallying point for his numerous raids into the interior of India. In the 12th century the Ghaurid empire of the Turkic origin overthrew the Ghaznavis and the era of Ghaznavis came to an end.

Mughal Era
In 1505 the Mughal emperor Babar invaded the area through Khyber Pass. Baber swiftly captured the area. The people of Swat in those days were of mix origins. On one side of the river lived Pashtuns along with Gujjar, Syriake people of whom many were Sikhs, Hindus and Muslims. In the battle of Bajaur in 1519, Baber defeated the Yousafzai tribe. The then ruler of Yousafzai tribe offered Baber her daughter as a sign of peace. Baber then married Bibi Mubarka Yousafzai, the maternal grandmother of Adham Khan who was a foster brother of Emperor Akbar. During the Aurangzeb regime, the Pashtun tribes revolted and Aurangzeb himself led his army to re-establish his authority as struggle which lasted for two years, he finally subdued the Pashtuns. In the same war the prominent rebel leader, Darya Khan Afridi was killed and the revolt was crushed. Later the area came under the rule of Ranjit Singh.

British Era
Ranjit Singh conquered Attock 1814 and Peshawar city in 1822. He left Hari Singh Nalwa in command and withdrew himself to Lahore. Peshawar city, Nowshera and Hazara were under Sikh rule for a while. Hazara was set free by Tanooli clan from Sikhs but fell to Britain in 1838. Peshawar city also fell to Pashtuns in 1834 [Nowla died in the battle of Jamrud] but soon the British took it in 1837. The British then went after the Sikhs and the Sikhs were defeated by the British in the Second Sikh War. Major Lawrence was appointed first Deputy Commissioner of Peshawar. From that time Peshawar city and Attock regions only (This does not include most of what is Khyber-Pakhtunkhwa today) became an administrative district under the Punjab Government. In 1909 Khyber-Pakhtunkhwa (then NWFP) was constituted and in 1937, Peshawar district was bifurcated into Peshawar and Mardan districts. Britain tried its best to include FATA, DIR, Swat and other region into Khyber-Pakhtunkhwa but they suffered heavy setback and finally came to an agreement in 1920s that Britain will no longer bother the tribes and Swat region.

Geography 
Mardan district may broadly be divided into two parts, north eastern hilly area and south western plain. The entire northern side of the district is bounded by the hills. In the district, the highest points in these hills are Pajja or Sakra, 2056 meters high and Garo or Pato, 1816 meters high. The south western half of the district is mostly composed of fertile plain with low hills strewn across it. It is generally accepted that this plain once formed the bed of a lake which was gradually filled up by the load of the river flowing into from the surrounding hills. From the foothills the plain runs down at first with a steep slope which carried the rain water to the lower levels and ultimately to the Kabul river.

Rivers and streams

Generally stream flows from north to the south. Most of the streams drain into Kabul river. Kalpani, an important stream of the district rises in the Baizai and flowing southwards join Kabul river. Other important streams which join Kalpani are Baghiari Khawar on the west and Muqam Khawar, coming from Sudham valley and Naranji Khawar from the Narangi hills on the left.

Climate

The summer season is extremely hot. A steep rise of temperature observed from May to June. Even July, August and September record quite high temperatures. During May and June dust storms are frequent at night. The temperature reaches to its maximum in the month of June i.e. . Due to intensive cultivation and artificial irrigation the tract is humid and heat is oppressive (Heat Index 69 on 7 July 2006). However, a rapid fat! of temperature has been recorded from October onwards. The coldest months are December and January.

Most of the rainfall occurs in the month of July, August, December and January. Maximum rainfall recorded for the month of August the rainiest month is 12S.8Smm. Towards the end of cold weather there are occasional thunder storms and hail storms. The relative humidity is quite high throughout the year while maximum humidity has been recorded in December i.e. 73.33 percent.

Flora

The present flora of the irrigated areas is exotic. The common trees are mesquite, ber, different species of acacia and jand. The most common shrubs are tarmariax, articulata, spands, akk, small red poppy, spera, pueghambrigul, drab grass, spera, eamelthorl and pohli chaulai etc.

Fauna

The district has a variety of fauna including 18 mammals, 120 birds and 3 reptiles.

Demographics

Population
At the time of the 2017 census the district had a population of 2,373,399, of which 1,201,122 were males and 1,172,215 females. Rural population was 1,933,177 (81.45%) while the urban population was 440,222 (18.55%). The literacy rate was 56.81% - the male literacy rate was 71.88% while the female literacy rate was 41.60%. Pashto was the predominant language, spoken by 98.25% of the population.

The population of Mardan district, according to official consensus, over the years is shown in the table below.

Religion

Food

The most common diet of the people is bread which is mainly made of wheat flour but maize bread is also eaten. Generally the foods are spicy. The people of the area are fond of meat, especially various forms of beef cooked in shape of chapli kebab, seekh kebab and tikkas etc. Mostly black tea with milk is taken as hot drink but Qahwa (green tea) is also popular and is liked by most of the people.

The oranges are a local famous fruit which is grown in Rustam valley in Palay, Palo Dheray, Baroch and Malandray villages. These oranges are transported to various parts of the country. A new access road to these villages is being constructed via Rustam through Kaludheri Srakabroona Baringan Malandry to Buner District.

Dwellings

The villages are divided into Kandis have congested house. Each Kandi is further occupied by sub-section. The division of Kandis are on the pattern of agricultural lands. Their houses are generally consists of two or three rooms and a courtyard turned as ghollai and verandah. The cattle and poultry are also accommodated beside the shelter for family.

Each Kandi of the village has its own mosque and its own Maulvi and a place of meeting or for public assembly called Hujra. In most cases it is the property of elders of the Kandi who is expected to feed and give shelter to the visitors and travellers. These Hujras are commonly used for the settlement of public disputes/business beside public meetings. Residents of Kandi assemble there to smoke, hear news of the day and discuss their problems and politics. Nowadays the people in service abroad have accumulated sufficient wealth which brought a distinct change in the life of the villagers who construct pacca houses of cement, bricks and timber.

A Tandoor (Oven) is also found for baking bread in many houses and some time women of three or four houses assembled on one Tandoor (Oven) for baking bread on their turn. The houses have huge compound walls around with gates. Chairs and tables are used in the houses of well-to-do persons whereas others use the ordinary cot (Charpoy).

Occupations

Most of the people are farmers in profession in villages. They are engaged in agriculture either directly or indirectly. Industrial labour has increased after the establishment of factories in different places of the district. Some people are engaged in-business and Government service also.

Economy 
Mardan is far famous for its economy and business mind people. Recent project of China Pakistan Economic Corridor bring more importance to this era. The border of Mardan, Rashakai is one of the major Economic Zone of this project which strengthen the Economy of Mardan.

Administration

The district of Mardan is administratively subdivided into five Tehsils.

 Mardan Tehsil
 Takht Bhai Tehsil
 Katlang Tehsil
 Rustam Tehsil
 Ghari Kapura Tehsil

Provincial and National Assembly Seats 
The district is represented in the provincial assembly by eight elected MPAs who represent the following constituencies:

National Assembly 
District Mardan is represented by three MNAs in national assembly.

Provincial Assembly

See also 
 Takkar massacre
 Takht-i-Bahi
 Jamal Garhi 
 Jamila Gilani
 Sawal Dher

References

External links
Mardan City Map

 
Districts of Khyber Pakhtunkhwa